Bathylagus antarcticus, the Antarctic deep-sea smelt, is a deep-sea smelt found around the southern ocean as far south as Antarctica, to depths of .  This species grows to a length of  SL.

References
 
 Tony Ayling & Geoffrey Cox, Collins Guide to the Sea Fishes of New Zealand,  (William Collins Publishers Ltd, Auckland, New Zealand 1982) 

antarcticus
Fish described in 1878
Taxa named by Albert Günther